Luis Eduardo Delgado Pacheco (born 4 December 1984), known as Luso, is a Spanish professional footballer who plays for CD La Almunia mainly as a defensive midfielder.

He amassed Segunda División totals of 224 games and 14 goals, with Girona, Córdoba, Huesca and Rayo Majadahonda. He added 18 appearances in La Liga with the second of those clubs.

Club career
Born in Zaragoza, Aragon, Luso graduated from Real Zaragoza's youth academy, and made his senior debut with the club's farm team, CD Universidad de Zaragoza. He reached the reserves shortly after, being deployed mostly as a right-back.

Luso went on to compete with Segunda División B and Tercera División sides in the following four seasons, representing UE Figueres, UE Rapitenca and UE Sant Andreu. With the latter, he achieved promotion in 2007–08.

On 23 July 2010, Luso joined Girona FC in the Segunda División. He played his first game as a professional on 28 August, coming on as a late substitute in a 4–2 home win over CD Tenerife. He scored his first goal on 11 December, closing the 1–1 home draw against RC Celta de Vigo. 

On 14 July 2013, Luso signed a three-year deal with fellow second-tier Córdoba CF. He was first-choice in his debut campaign, as the club returned to La Liga after a 42-year absence. 

Luso's maiden appearance in the Spanish top flight occurred on 28 September 2014, when he started a 0–0 home draw against RCD Espanyol. His first goal in the competition came the following 17 May in a 1–2 loss to Rayo Vallecano also at the Estadio Nuevo Arcángel, as his team were already relegated.

On 14 July 2017, Luso signed a two-year contract with SD Huesca in division two after cutting ties with Córdoba. On 23 July of the following year, after achieving promotion to the top tier, he joined CF Rayo Majadahonda of the same league.

Luso returned to the lower leagues subsequently and remained there until his retirement, representing in quick succession Lleida Esportiu, CD Tudelano and SD Ejea.

References

External links

1984 births
Living people
Spanish footballers
Footballers from Zaragoza
Association football midfielders
Association football utility players
La Liga players
Segunda División players
Segunda División B players
Tercera División players
Segunda Federación players
Tercera Federación players
CD Universidad de Zaragoza players
Real Zaragoza B players
UE Figueres footballers
UE Sant Andreu footballers
Girona FC players
Córdoba CF players
SD Huesca footballers
CF Rayo Majadahonda players
Lleida Esportiu footballers
CD Tudelano footballers
SD Ejea players